John F. Quinn (born April 7, 1963 in New Bedford, Massachusetts) is an American politician who represented 9th Bristol District in the Massachusetts House of Representatives from 1992–2011. He was an unsuccessful candidate for Bristol County Sheriff  in 2010. He is currently the Assistant Dean for Public Interest Law and External Relations at UMASS Law.

References

External links
 

1963 births
Living people
Harvard Kennedy School alumni
Democratic Party members of the Massachusetts House of Representatives
People from New Bedford, Massachusetts
Suffolk University Law School alumni
University of Massachusetts Dartmouth alumni
People from Dartmouth, Massachusetts